Frederick Wilkes (1869 – after 1892) was an English professional footballer who played in the Football Alliance for Small Heath.

Wilkes was born in the Handsworth district of Birmingham and began his football career with Handsworth Boys Club. He signed for Small Heath in April 1891, and played in a few friendly matches at the end of that season. With Harry Morris struggling for fitness towards the end of his career, Wilkes was one of six players tried at centre forward during the 1891–92 Football Alliance season. He scored a hat-trick in the Fourth Qualifying Round of the FA Cup against Brierley Hill Alliance. At the end of the season he moved into non-league football with Brownhills.

References

1869 births
Year of death missing
Footballers from Birmingham, West Midlands
English footballers
Association football forwards
Birmingham City F.C. players
Football Alliance players
Date of birth missing
Place of death missing
Footballers from Handsworth, West Midlands